The 1996–97 B Group was the forty-first season of the Bulgarian B Football Group, the second tier of the Bulgarian football league system. A total of 18 teams contested the league.

Litex Lovech, Olimpik Galata and Metalurg Pernik were promoted to Bulgarian A Group. Lokomotiv Ruse, Parva Atomna Kozloduy, Spartak Plovdiv, Lokomotiv Gorna Oryahovitsa, Chirpan and Hebar Pazardzhik were relegated.

League table

Top scorers

References

External links 
 1996–97 Bulgarian B Group season

Bul

1996-97
2